The following is a list of albums that have been certified Gold, Platinum, and Multi-platinum by the Irish Recorded Music Association.

Gold

Accelerate
Aerial
All I Ever Wanted
Animal
The Annie Lennox Collection
As I Am
Battle Born
Beyoncé
DNA
Dreams: The Ultimate Corrs Collection
Femme Fatale
Flamingo
Glee: The Music, The Christmas Album
Glee: The Music, Volume 4
Here I Stand
Keeps Gettin' Better: A Decade of Hits
The Lady Killer
Most Wanted
My December
One Love
Picture This
Plastic Beach
Simply Deep
Sleep Through the Static
Sorry for Party Rocking
Surprise
Sticks + Stones
Talkie Walkie
The Ballads
The Very Best of Enya
Walking on a Dream
Working Class Hero: The Definitive Lennon
X

Platinum

4
21st Century Breakdown
Absolute Greatest
AM
Amarantine
And Winter Came...
Blackout
Breakout
Brother
Change
Circus
Dua Lipa
Electra Heart
Complete Clapton
The Defamation of Strickland Banks
Froot
Dylan
Echo
Funhouse
Get Weird
Greatest Hits (Journey)
Greatest Hits (Mariah Carey)
I Look to You
Infinity on High
Iron Man 2
La Roux
Messy Little Raindrops
No Line on the Horizon
Nothing but the Beat
One of the Boys
Outta This World
PCD
Rated R
Shepherd Moons
The Soul Sessions
Stripped
This Is It
We Started Nothing

Multi-platinum

Two times

3 Words
A Girl Like Me
Born This Way
Fearless
Glory Days
Greatest Hits (Bon Jovi)
Greatest Hits (Enrique Iglesias)
Home
I Am... Sasha Fierce
It's Not Me, It's You
In Case You Didn't Know
Mine & Yours
My Christmas
Mylo Xyloto
Now That's What I Call Music! 78
Oral Fixation Vol. 2
Overcome
Planet Jedward
Taller in More Ways
Teenage Dream
Ultimate Collection (Eurythmics)
Up All Night
The Ultimate Collection (Whitney Houston)
Up to Now
Victory
Who You Are
Working on a Dream

Three times

B'Day
Back to Basics
Ceremonials
Greatest Hits (Shania Twain)
Love. Angel. Music. Baby.
Ultimate Kylie
Talk That Talk

Four times

1989
Day & Age
Doo-Wops & Hooligans
Fallen
Lungs
Piece by Piece
Sunny Side Up
Sam's Town
Viva la Vida or Death and All His Friends

Five times

Eye to the Telescope
Good Girl Gone Bad
Loud
Now That's What I Call Music! 74
Now That's What I Call Music! 80
Only by the Night
Science & Faith
This Is It

Six times

Greatest Hits: My Prerogative
+
Greatest Hits (Guns N' Roses)
Gold: Greatest Hits (ABBA)
Now That's What I Call Music! 77
Progress
U218 Singles
(What's the Story) Morning Glory?

Seven times

Breakaway
Christmas
Eyes Open
Hot Fuss
Spirit

Eight times

The Circus
Face to Face
I Dreamed a Dream
X&Y

Nine times

The Fame
Spice

Thirteen times

Forgiven, Not Forgotten

Fourteen times

X

15 times
Crazy Love

20 times
Talk on Corners

23 times
White Ladder

References

Lists of best-selling albums
Ireland